Lee Anderson may refer to:
Lee Anderson (American politician) (born 1957), representative in the Georgia House of Representatives
Lee Anderson (British politician) (born 1967), MP for Ashfield
Lee Anderson (boxer) (1889–1946), two time World Colored Light Heavyweight Champ
Lee R. Anderson Sr. (born 1939), owner and chairman of APi Group, Inc.

See also
Jon Lee Anderson (born 1957), American writer
Lee Andersen, The Bill character played by Christopher Simon
Leroy Anderson (disambiguation)